Lucinda Ramberg is an American anthropologist whose work focuses on gender, sexuality, religion and health. She was awarded multiple prizes in 2015 for her first book, Given to the Goddess: South Indian Devadasis and the Sexuality of Religion. Ramberg is associate professor in anthropology and director of graduate studies in the Feminist, Gender, and Sexuality Studies program at Cornell University.

Biography 
Ramberg graduated from Bryn Mawr College with a BA in English Literature. She later attended Union Theological Seminary and earned a MA in Theology. Ramberg furthered her studies at the University of California, Berkeley, where she received a PhD in medical anthropology.

Ramberg's work focuses on medical anthropology, religion, sexuality and gender in South Asia. Ramberg was assistant professor at University of Kentucky’s Department of Gender and Women's Studies from 2007 to 2011. From 2009 to 2010, she was visiting assistant professor at the Harvard Divinity School Women's Studies in Religion Program.

Ramberg is currently associate professor in anthropology and director of graduate studies in the Feminist, Gender, and Sexuality Studies program at Cornell University. Her first book, Given to the Goddess: South Indian Devadasis and the Sexuality of Religion (2014) was awarded the 2015 Clifford Geertz Prize in the anthropology of religion, the Michelle Rosaldo Book Prize for a first book in feminist anthropology, and the 2015 Ruth Benedict Prize from the Association for Queer Anthropology.

Awards
 Ruth Benedict Prize, (2015)
 Michelle Rosaldo Book Prize, (2015)
Geertz Prize in the Anthropology of Religion (2015)

Selected publications

Journals

Books

References 

Living people
American anthropologists
American women anthropologists
University of California, Berkeley alumni
Bryn Mawr College alumni
Cornell University faculty
Year of birth missing (living people)
American women academics
21st-century American women